In graph theory, the modular decomposition is a decomposition of a graph into subsets of vertices called modules.  A module is a generalization of a connected component of a graph.  Unlike connected components, however, one module can be a proper subset of another.   Modules therefore lead to a recursive (hierarchical) decomposition of the graph, instead of just a partition.

There are variants of modular decomposition for undirected graphs and directed graphs. For each undirected graph, this decomposition is unique.

This notion can be generalized to other structures (for example directed graphs) and is useful to design efficient algorithms for the recognition of some graph classes, for finding transitive orientations of comparability graphs, for optimization problems on graphs, and for graph drawing.

Modules 

As the notion of modules has been rediscovered in many areas, modules have also been called autonomous sets, homogeneous sets, stable sets, clumps, committees, externally related sets, intervals, nonsimplifiable subnetworks, and partitive sets .   Perhaps the earliest reference to them, and the first description of modular quotients and the graph decomposition they give rise to appeared in (Gallai 1967).

A module of a graph is a generalization of a connected component. (It is a union of connected components if and only if it has this property.)

Contrary to the connected components, the modules of a graph are the same as the modules of its complement, and modules can be "nested": one module can be a proper subset of another. Note that the set  of vertices of a graph is a module, as are its one-element subsets and the empty set;  these are called the trivial modules.  A graph may or may not have other modules.  A graph is called prime if all of its modules are trivial.

Despite these differences, modules preserve a desirable property of connected components, which is that many properties of the subgraph  induced by a connected component  are independent of the rest of the graph.  A similar phenomenon also applies to the subgraphs induced by modules.

The modules of a graph are therefore of great algorithmic interest.  A set of nested modules, of which the modular decomposition is an example,  can be used to guide the recursive solution of many combinatorial problems on graphs, such as recognizing and transitively orienting comparability graphs, recognizing and finding permutation representations of permutation graphs, recognizing whether a graph is a cograph and finding a certificate of the answer to the question, recognizing interval graphs and finding interval representations for them, defining distance-hereditary graphs (Spinrad, 2003) and for graph drawing (Papadopoulos, 2006).  They play an important role in Lovász's celebrated proof of the perfect graph theorem (Golumbic, 1980).

For recognizing distance-hereditary graphs and circle graphs, a further generalization of modular decomposition, called the split decomposition, is especially useful (Spinrad, 2003).

To avoid the possibility of ambiguity in the above definitions, we give the following formal definitions of modules. 
.
 is a module of  if:
 the vertices of  have the same set of outer neighbors, i.e., .

A graph is prime if all its modules are trivial.

 is a strong module of a graph  if it does not overlap any other module of :

Modular quotients and factors 

Thus, the relationship between two disjoint modules is either adjacent or nonadjacent. No relationship intermediate between these two extremes can exist.

Because of this, modular partitions of  where each partition class is a module are of particular interest. Suppose  is a modular partition.

In the figure below,   vertex 1, vertices 2 through 4, vertex 5, vertices 6 and 7, and vertices 8 through 11 are a modular partition.  In the upper right diagram, the edges between these sets depict the quotient given by this partition, while the edges internal to the sets depict the corresponding factors.

Suppose  is a nontrivial module. Thus, the existence of any nontrivial modules implies the existence of nontrivial modular partitions. In general, many or all members of  can be nontrivial modules.

Therefore, the edges of  can be reconstructed given only the quotient graph  and its factors. The term prime graph comes from the fact that a prime graph has only trivial quotients and factors.

When  is a factor of a modular quotient , it is possible that  can be recursively decomposed into factors and quotients.  Each level of the recursion gives rise to a quotient.  As a base case, the graph has only one vertex.  Collectively,  can be reconstructed inductively by reconstructing the factors from the bottom up, inverting the steps of the decomposition by combining factors with the quotient at each level.

In the figure below, such a recursive decomposition is represented by a tree that  depicts one way of recursively decomposing factors of an initial modular partition into smaller modular partitions.

A way to recursively decompose a graph into factors and quotients may not be unique.  (For example, all subsets of the vertices of a complete graph are modules, which means that there are many different ways of decomposing it recursively.)  Some ways may be more useful than others.

The modular decomposition 

Fortunately, there exists such a recursive decomposition of a graph that implicitly represents all ways of decomposing it; this is the modular decomposition.  It is itself a way of decomposing a graph recursively into quotients, but it subsumes all others.  The decomposition depicted in the figure below is this special decomposition for the given graph.

The following is a key observation in understanding the modular decomposition:

In (Gallai, 1967), Gallai defined the modular decomposition recursively on a graph with vertex set , as follows:

 As a base case, if  only has one vertex, its modular decomposition is a single tree node.
They are therefore a modular partition. The quotient that they define is prime.
 If  is disconnected, its complement is connected. All other modules are subsets of a single connected component. This represents all modules, except for subsets of connected components. The quotient defined by the children is the complement of a complete graph.
The root of the tree is labeled a serial node, and the quotient defined by the children is a complete graph.

It is in this sense that the modular decomposition tree "subsumes" all other ways of recursively decomposing  into quotients.

Algorithmic issues

A data structure for representing the modular decomposition tree should support the operation that inputs a node and returns the set of vertices of  that the node represents.  An obvious way to do this is to assign to each node a list of the  vertices of  that it represents.   Given a pointer to a node, this structure could return the set of vertices of  that it represents in  time.  However, this data structure would require  space in the worst case. 
  

An -space alternative that matches this performance  is obtained by representing the modular decomposition tree using any standard  rooted-tree data structure and labeling each leaf with the vertex of  that it represents. The set represented by an internal node  is given by the set of labels of its leaf descendants. It is well known that any rooted tree with  leaves has at most  internal nodes.

For example,  is a comparability graph if and only if each of these quotients is a comparability graph (Gallai, 67; Möhring, 85). Therefore, to find whether a graph is a comparability graph, one need only find whether each of the quotients is. In fact, to find a transitive orientation of a comparability graph, it suffices to transitively orient each of these quotients of its modular decomposition (Gallai, 67; Möhring, 85). A similar phenomenon applies for permutation graphs, (McConnell and Spinrad '94), interval graphs (Hsu and Ma '99), perfect graphs, and other graph classes. Some important combinatorial optimization problems on graphs can be solved using a similar strategy (Möhring, 85).

Cographs are the graphs that only have parallel or series nodes in their modular decomposition tree.

The first polynomial algorithm to compute the modular decomposition tree of a graph was published in 1972  (James, Stanton & Cowan 1972) and now linear algorithms are available (McConnell & Spinrad 1999, Tedder et al. 2007, Cournier & Habib 1994).

Generalizations
Modular decomposition of directed graphs can be done in linear time .

With a small number of simple exceptions, every graph with a nontrivial modular decomposition also has a skew partition .

References

External links 
 A Perl implementation of a modular decomposition algorithm
 A Java implementation of a modular decomposition algorithm
 A Julia implementation of a modular decomposition algorithm

Graph theory objects